Route 122 is a primary, minor arterial highway in the United States. It begins at Interstate 95 in West Haven, Connecticut. It runs north of West Haven center and roughly follows the path of the West River. It then enters the Westville neighborhood of New Haven and ends at Route 63 (Whalley Avenue).

Route description
Route 122 officially begins as First Avenue in West Haven at the end of the southbound Exit 43 ramp of I-95 heading north. First Avenue continues south of the interchange as an unsigned state highway (SR 745). First Avenue ends at Campbell Avenue in the Allingtown section of West Haven while Route 122 continues north on Campbell Avenue. The road passes by the University of New Haven, crosses US 1 at diagonal four-corners involving two sets of traffic lights, then continues north as Forest Road. Forest Road travels for another  following the line of the West River. Along the way it intersects Route 34 (Derby Turnpike) and enters the Westville neighborhood of New Haven. Forest Road ends at Route 243 (Fountain Street). Route 122 jogs left and right, continuing north on Dayton Street for another block until its end at Route 63 (Whalley Avenue).

History
In the 1920s, old State Highway 337 ran from Route 1 in downtown Milford via Woodmont and West Haven center, ending at Campbell Avenue in the Allingtown section of West Haven. The old route went along current Route 162 to Ocean Avenue, then ran along the West Haven shoreline to First Avenue, then north along First Avenue. In the 1932 state highway renumbering, old Highway 337 was renumbered to Route 122. Route 158 was also established in 1932 and ran along Campbell Avenue and Forest Road from West Haven center (Campbell Avenue and Main Street) to Westville (Forest Road and Fountain Street). In 1950, the Route 158 designation was removed and the portion north of First Avenue was added as a northward extension of Route 122. The portion of former Route 158 south of First Avenue was transferred to the town. In 1962, Route 122 was extended north to Whalley Avenue (Route 63) along Dayton Street. In 1966, the south end of Route 122 was truncated to end at I-95, while Route 162 was extended along the Milford portion of Route 122.

Junction list

State Road 745
It runs south as First Avenue, then turns east at Elm Street. After crossing the West River into New Haven, the road becomes Kimberly Avenue and has an interchange with I-95 at Exit 44. SR 745 ends at Route 10 (Ella T. Grasso Boulevard).

History
SR 717 (before)
SR 794 (after)

References

External links

122
Route 122
Transportation in New Haven County, Connecticut
Transportation in New Haven, Connecticut